Kaya is a city in Central Equatoria, South Sudan.

Location
The city is located in Kimba Payam, Morobo County, Central Equatoria State, in extreme southwestern South Sudan. It is located near the international border with the Republic of Uganda. Kaya sits directly across the border from Oraba, in Uganda.

History
Kaya was a battle scene during the Second Sudanese Civil War and was conquered by the Sudanese People's Liberation Army during Operation Thunderbolt on 10 March 1997.

Foreign help
On October 6th 2017, Uganda pledged to supply power to two South Sudanese border towns as part of the Eastern Africa Power Pool agreement. The agreement  calls on all member states to connect electricity to each other. Uganda's energy minister Simon D'Ujanga said "400 kilo-volts of power will be supplied to the towns of Kaya and Nimule to boost socio-economic activities in the border areas".

Demographics
There are no reliable population estimates for the city because:
 The Second Sudanese Civil War (1983–2005) forced many citizens to flee the city. Since the signing of the Comprehensive Peace Agreement in January 2005, a constant stream of South Sudanese returnees use the city as a transit point to re-enter the country
 Kaya is a busy commercial center, attracting traders from South Sudan, Uganda and the Democratic Republic of the Congo

Economy
The city's infrastructure was badly damaged during the civil war. However, since the cessation of hostilities in 2005, commercial life is gradually returning to the city. The road between Kaya and Yei was repaired. It was financed by the United Nations Human Settlements Programme and the World Food Program. With those repairs completed, the travel time between Kaya and Yei was reduced from five hours to one. The city is served by a branch of Equity Bank South Sudan Limited.

Points of interest
The following points of interest are found in or near the city:

 The offices of Kaya City Council
 The administrative headquarters of Kaya Payam
 Kaya Central Market
 A presbyterian church, built in 2003
 The Kaya HIV/AIDS Health Center - built in 2010 with USAID funds, the center offers counselling testing and treatment
 The precise tripoint of the international borders of South Sudan, Uganda, and the Democratic Republic of the Congo lies a few kilometres south of Kaya

Tribes in Kaya 

 Irava 
 Mujuru
 Itori

Common languages spoken in Kaya 

 English
 Kiswahili
 Juba Arabic
 Kakwa
 Lugbara
 Pojulu
 Kuku
 Mundari
 Lingala
 Dinka
 Nuer
 Sulk
 Zande
 Abukaya
 Lugand

See also
 Equatoria
 List of cities in South Sudan

References

External links
Gurtong Peace Project with information about South Sudan

Populated places in Yei River State
South Sudan–Uganda border crossings